The Volkswagen New Compact Coupé (short Volkswagen NCC) is a close to production concept car of the German car manufacturer Volkswagen. The car was presented on the NAIAS 2010 in Detroit. It is equipped with a hybrid drive, and is positioned between the Volkswagen Scirocco and the Volkswagen Passat CC. 

The average fuel consumption is just 4.2 litres per 100 kilometers; the emission value is 98 grams of CO2 per kilometer. In contrast, the driving values are a top speed of 227 km/h and a sprint time of 8.6 seconds from 0 to 100 km/h.

The body of the vehicle is a resemblance of the 6th generation of the Volkswagen Jetta but as a 2-door style. This is also a reference to 2nd generation of the Volkswagen Jetta in which some of its models had 2-door options.

External links 

 Schöner sparen: VW zeigt Kompakt-Coupé in Detroit 
 Kommt so das neue Golf Coupé? 
 Neue Coupé-Studie in Detroit präsentiert 

New Compact Coupe
Cars introduced in 2010